Saint-Eugène-de-Guigues, often shortened to Saint-Eugène, is a municipality in northwestern Quebec, Canada, in the Témiscamingue Regional County Municipality.

Demographics
Population trend:
 Population in 2011: 454 (2006 to 2011 population change: -4.2%)
 Population in 2006: 474
 Population in 2001: 439
 Population in 1996: 423
 Population in 1991: 415

Private dwellings occupied by usual residents: 182 (total dwellings: 185)

Mother tongue:
 English as first language: 2.2%
 French as first language: 97.8%
 English and French as first language: 0%
 Other as first language: 0%

See also
 List of municipalities in Quebec

References

Municipalities in Quebec
Incorporated places in Abitibi-Témiscamingue
Témiscamingue Regional County Municipality